This is a list of South African women writers, including women writers either from or associated with South Africa.

A
 Barbara Adair (living), novelist
 Wilna Adriaanse (born 1958), romantic fiction writer
 Jani Allan (born 1952), journalist, columnist, broadcaster
 Phyllis Altman (1919–1999)
 Ingrid Andersen (born 1965), poet
 Diane Awerbuck (born 1947), novelist

B
 Gabeba Baderoon (born 1969), poet
 Margaret Bakkes (1931–2016) 
 Lesley Beake (born 1949), children's author
 Dricky Beukes (1918–1999), writer of novels, short stories and radio dramas
 Lauren Beukes (born 1976), novelist, short story writer, journalist and television scriptwriter
 Audrey Blignault (1916–2008) 
 Anna Böeseken (1905–1997), history academic, journalist and writer
 Johanna Brandt (1876–1964)
 Sarah Britten (born 1974), writer and blogger
 Babette Brown (1931–2019), writer on race and diversity issues in the United Kingdom.
 Penny Busetto (living), novelist

C
 Maxine Case (born 1976), novelist and short story writer
 Cecile Cilliers (1933–2018), journalist and writer
 Yvette Christiansë (born 1954), poet and novelist
 Lindsey Collen (born 1948), novelist and activist
 Jeni Couzyn (born 1942), poet and anthologist
 Hazel Crane (1951–2003), memoirist
 Judy Croome (born 1958), novelist, short story writer and poet
 Sheila Cussons (1922–2004), Afrikaans poet

D
 Alide Dasnois (born 1950), journalist and newspaper editor
 Nadia Davids (born 1977)
 Marike de Klerk (1937–2001)
 Ingrid de Kok (born 1951), poet
 Phillippa Yaa de Villiers (born 1966), poet
 Janette Deacon (born 1939)
 Isobel Dixon (born 1969), poet
 Ceridwen Dovey (born 1980)
 Finuala Dowling (born 1962), poet

E
 Elisabeth Eybers (1915–2007), poet

F
 Dawn Faith (born 1982), author, musician and social activist
 Diana Ferrus (born 1953), poet
 Mary Anne Fitzgerald (born c. 1945), journalist
 Corlia Fourie (born 1944), writer of drama, children's books, short stories and novels
 Lynn Freed (born 1945), novelist, essayist, and writer of short stories
 Patricia Fresen (born 1940)
 Lisa Fugard (living)
 Sheila Meiring Fugard (born 1932), writer of short stories and plays

G
 Jeanne Goosen (1938–2020), journalist and poet
 Nadine Gordimer (1923–2014), novelist, political activist and recipient of the 1991 Nobel Prize in Literature
 Lyndall Gordon (born 1941), literary biographer
 Sheila Gordon (1927–2013)
 Pregs Govender (born 1960), feminist human rights activist, author and former Member of Parliament 
 Henriette Grové (1922–2009)

H
 Megan Hall (born 1972), poet
 Joan Hambidge (born 1956), Afrikaans poet, literary theorist and academic
 Stacy Hardy (living), writer, journalist, multimedia artist and theatre practitioner
 Marié Heese (born 1942), novelist and teacher
 Cat Hellisen (born 1977), author of fantasy novels
 Colleen Higgs (born 1962), writer and publisher
 Heidi Holland (1947–2012),  journalist and author
 Emma Huismans (born 1947), writer, journalist, and activist

J
 Noni Jabavu (1919–2008), writer and journalist
 Cynthia Jele (living), novelist
 Liesl Jobson (living), poet and musician
 Sarah Johnson (born 1980), poet
 Isabel Jean Jones (died 2008), consumer journalist
 Ingrid Jonker (1933–1965), poet
 Pamela Jooste (living), novelist
 Elsa Joubert (1922–2020), Afrikaans-language novelist
 Irma Joubert (living), novelist
 Leonie Joubert (living), science writer, author and journalist

K
 Ronelda Kamfer (born 1981), poet
 Farida Karodia (born 1942), novelist and short-story writer
 Anne Kellas (living), poet, reviewer and editor
 Olga Kirsch (1924–1997), poet
 Elizabeth Klarer (1910–1994)
 Sheila Kohler (born 1941), novelist and short story writer
 Antjie Krog (born 1952), poet and academic
 Ellen Kuzwayo (1914–2006), women's rights activist, politician and autobiographer

L
 Anne Landsman (born 1959), novelist
 Lauren Liebenberg (born 1972), novelist
 Freda Linde (1915–2013), children's writer and translator
 Anna M. Louw (1913–2003)

M
 Rozena Maart (born 1962)
 Michelle McGrane (born 1974), poet
 Lindiwe Mabuza (1938–2021), poet, academic, journalist, diplomat
 Sindiwe Magona (born 1943)
 Angela Makholwa (living), crime fiction writer
 Barbara Masekela (born 1941), poet, educator, activist
 Mohale Mashigo (living), singer-songwriter, novelist and former radio presenter 
 Lebogang Mashile (born 1979), actor, writer and performance poet
 Emma Mashinini (1929–2017) 
 Kopano Matlwa (born 1985), novelist
 Dalene Matthee (1938–2005), novelist 
 Fatima Meer (1928–2010), writer, academic, screenwriter
 Joan Metelerkamp (born 1956), poet
 Nontsizi Mgqwetho (fl. 1920s), poet
 Gcina Mhlope (born 1958), actress, storyteller, poet, playwright, director
 Kirsten Miller (living)
 Ruth Miller (1919–1969), poet
 Sarah Millin (1889–1968)
 Natalia Molebatsi (living), performance poet and cultural worker
 Marion Molteno (born 1944), novelist
 Rose Moss (born 1937), writer of novels, short stories, words for music and non-fiction
 Natasha Mostert (living), author and screenwriter
 Isabella Motadinyane (1963–2003), poet and actor
 Ena Murray (1936–2015)
 Sally-Ann Murray (born 1961)

N
 Beverley Naidoo (living), writer of children's books
 Thirza Nash (1885–1962), novelist
 Bongi Ndaba (born 1972)
 Lauretta Ngcobo (1931–2015), novelist and essayist
 Paige Nick (living), novelist
 Michelle Nkamankeng (born c. 2008)
 Cecily Norden (1918–2011)

O
 Bree O'Mara (1968–2010), novelist
 Yewande Omotoso (born 1980), novelist, architect and designer
 Margie Orford (born 1964), author of crime fiction, children's fiction, non-fiction and school textbooks

P
 Joy Packer (1905–1977), author of autobiography and romantic adventure novels
 S. A. Partridge (born 1982), author of young adult fiction
 Amelia Blossom Pegram (1935–2022), poet
 Antoinette Pienaar (born 1961)
 Bridget Pitt (living)
 Marguerite Poland (born 1950)
 Elsa Pooley (born 1947)
 Karen Press (born 1956), poet
 Elaine Proctor (born 1960), film director, screenwriter, novelist, and actress

Q
 Christine Qunta (born 1952)

R
 Jo-Anne Richards (living), journalist and author
 Margaret Roberts (1937–2017), herbalist and author
 Daphne Rooke (1914–2009) 
 Henrietta Rose-Innes (born 1971), novelist and short story writer
 Maria Elizabeth Rothmann (1875–1975)
 Rona Rupert (1934–1995)
 Diana E. H. Russell (1938–2020), feminist writer and activist

S
 Arja Salafranca (born 1971), poet
 Lin Sampson (living), journalist
 Riana Scheepers (born 1957), writer of children's books, short fiction and poetry
 Karin Schimke (born 1968)
 Patricia Schonstein (born 1952), novelist, poet, author of children’s books 
 Olive Schreiner (1855–1920), novelist, anti-war campaigner
 Judith Sealy (living)
 Jenefer Shute (living), novelist
 Joyce Sikakane (born 1943),  journalist and activist
 Ansuyah Ratipul Singh (1917–1978), medical doctor and writer
 Elinor Sisulu (born 1958), writer and activist
 Paula Slier (living), television, radio and print journalist
 Gillian Slovo (born 1952), novelist, playwright and memoirist
 Charlene Leonora Smith (living), journalist and biographer of Nelson Mandela
 Louise Smit (born 1940), writer of children's books
 Pauline Smith (1882–1959), novelist
 Lina Spies (born 1939), poet
 Dianne Stewart (born 1952)
 Wilma Stockenström (born 1933), writer, translator, and actor
 Cynthia Stockley (1873–1936), novelist
 Toni Stuart (born 1983), poet

T
 Jane Taylor (born 1956)
 Gladys Thomas (born 1934), playwright, poet and children's writer
 Miriam Tlali (1933–2017), novelist
 Lesego Tlhabi (born 1988), writer and comedian
 Marianne du Toit (born 1970)
 Barbara Trapido (born 1941)
 Jann Turner (born 1964), film director, novelist, television director and screenwriter

U
 Shereen Usdin (born 1962)

V
 Marita van der Vyver (born 1958)
 Marjorie van Heerden (born 1949)
 Mary-Anne Plaatjies van Huffel (1959–2020)
 Marlene van Niekerk (born 1954)
 Verna Vels (1933–2014)
 Lettie Viljoen, pseudonym of author Ingrid Winterbach (living)

W
 Zukiswa Wanner (born 1976), journalist and novelist
 Harriet Ward (1808–1873)
 Marie Warder (1927–2014)
 Crystal Warren (living)
 Mary Watson (born 1975)
 Elizabeth Weber (born 1923)
 Mary Morison Webster (1894–1980), novelist and poet
 Zoë Wicomb (born 1948), author and academic
 Sarah Wild (living), science journalist and author
 Margaret Wild (born 1948)
 Faldela Williams (1952–2014)
 Wendy Wood (1892–1981)

X
 Makhosazana Xaba (born 1957), poet

Z
 Rachel Zadok (living), novelist
 Rose Zwi (1928–2018)

See also
 List of women writers

Lists of women writers by nationality
Writers
Writers,Women